Kuajina Payam is a payam (district) of Jur River County in South Sudan state of Western Bahr el Ghazal. is located in the southeast of the Western Bahr el Ghazal state. The Bomas of Kuajina Payam includes Kuajina, Mbili, Mapel, and Dankachak Boma. Local population are from Luwo tribe.

Western Bahr el Ghazal